The Diocese of Killaloe is a Roman Catholic diocese in mid-western Ireland, one of six suffragan dioceses in the ecclesiastical province of Cashel and Emly.

The cathedral church of the diocese is the Cathedral of Ss Peter and Paul in Ennis, County Clare.

The incumbent bishop of the diocese is Fintan Monahan.

Geography
The diocese is divided into 58 parishes, which are spread across five counties: 38 in Clare, thirteen in Tipperary, five in Offaly, one in Limerick, and one group parish in Laois.

The parishes are grouped into 15 Pastoral Areas, where groups of priests are appointed to cover a number of parishes between them.

As of 2018, there were 90 priests in the diocese: 52 under and 38 over the mandatory retirement age of 75. However, by 2020, this had decreased to 70: 36 under and 34 over 70.

Aside from the cathedral town of Ennis, the main towns in the diocese are Birr, Kilrush, Nenagh, Roscrea and Shannon.

Ordinaries

The following lists the ten most recent bishops:
Patrick Kennedy (1836–1851) 
Daniel Vaughan (1851–1859) 
Michael Flannery (1859–1891)
Thomas J. McRedmond (1891–1904)
 Michael Fogarty (1904–1955)
 Joseph Rodgers (1955–1966) 
 Michael Harty (1967–1994) 
Willie Walsh (1994–2010)
Kieran O'Reilly (2010–2015)
Fintan Monahan (2016–present)

See also
 Catholic Church in Ireland
Church of Ireland Diocese of Limerick and Killaloe
Middle Third
Thomond

References

External links 
 Diocese of Killaloe at Catholic-Hierarchy.org

 
Killaloe
1111 establishments in Ireland
Roman Catholic dioceses established in the 12th century
Religion in County Clare
Religion in County Laois
Religion in County Limerick
Religion in County Offaly
Religion in County Tipperary
Roman Catholic Ecclesiastical Province of Cashel